Kurchatov is a town in Kursk Oblast, Russia, located on the Seym River  west of Kursk. Population:

History
Kurchatov was founded in 1968 due to the construction of the Kursk Nuclear Power Plant and granted town status in 1983. It was named after a Soviet physicist Igor Kurchatov.

The town of Kurchatov, along with the neighbouring Kursk Nuclear Power Plant, stood in for the town of Pripyat and the Chernobyl Nuclear Power Plant in the 1991 American television movie, Chernobyl: The Final Warning.

Administrative and municipal status
Within the framework of administrative divisions, Kurchatov serves as the administrative center of Kurchatovsky District, even though it is not a part of it. As an administrative division, it is incorporated separately as the town of oblast significance of Kurchatov—an administrative unit with the status equal to that of the districts. As a municipal division, the town of oblast significance of Kurchatov is incorporated as Kurchatov Urban Okrug.

References

Notes

Sources

Cities and towns in Kursk Oblast
Cities and towns built in the Soviet Union
Populated places established in 1968
1968 establishments in the Soviet Union